Age of Adonxs (stylized in all caps) is the debut solo studio album by Slovak singer-songwriter ADONXS, released on November 11, 2022, via Warner. The album marks his first body of work since his 2018 EP Keeper released with his alt-pop band PACE. The album was preceded by three singles, two of which topped the SK Top 50 Chart. It has been pre-nominated for the 2022 Anděl Award for Best Slovak Album.

Background 
Following his 2021 win in SuperStar, Adonxs signed with Warner and began writing and recording his solo material with producer Oliver Fillner. Recording took place at the Lavagance Studios in Bratislava, Slovakia, from January to November 2022. In early January, Adonxs recorded four songs from the album, including "Moving On", which would become the lead single.

Promotion and release

Singles 
Age of Adonxs was supported by four singles, two of which topped the SK Top 50 Chart. The debut solo single "Moving On" marked his first number one on the chart. The second single "Game" marked his second number one on the SK Top 50 Chart, where it reigned atop for eight consecutive weeks. The third single "Cold Summer" was released on October 18, 2022. The album was officially released on November 11, 2022. Musicserver rated it as the best album of 2022 in Slovakia. It received nominations at the 2022 Ruka Hore Awards as well as the 2022 Anděl Awards.

Tour 

Five days following the album release, Adonxs embarked on the Adonxs On Tour. It covered Slovakia and the Czech Republic with 6 dates. It commenced on November 16, 2022, in Trenčín, Slovakia, and concluded on December 7, 2022, in Prague, Czech Republic. Czech singer Maella supported him as an opening act on all tour dates.

Awards and nominations

Track listing 
Credits adapted from the album's liner notes.

References 

2022 albums